The Révolution nationale (National Revolution) was the official ideological program promoted by the Vichy regime (the “French State”) which had been established in July 1940 and led by Marshal Philippe Pétain. Pétain's regime was characterized by anti-parliamentarism, personality cultism, xenophobia, state-sponsored anti-Semitism, promotion of traditional values, rejection of the constitutional separation of powers, modernity, and corporatism, as well as opposition to the theory of class conflict. Despite its name, the ideological policies were reactionary rather than revolutionary as the program opposed almost every change introduced to French society by the French Revolution.

As soon as it was established, Pétain's government took measures against the “undesirables”, namely Jews, métèques (foreigners), Freemasons, and Communists. The persecution of these four groups was inspired by Charles Maurras’ concept of the "Anti-France", or "internal foreigners", which he defined as the "four confederate states of Protestants, Jews, Freemasons and foreigners". The regime also persecuted Gypsies, homosexuals, and left-wing activists in general. Vichy imitated the racial policies of the Third Reich and also engaged in natalist policies aimed at reviving the "French race" (including a sports policy), although these policies never went as far as Nazi eugenics.

Ideology 

The ideology of the French State (Vichy France) was an adaptation of the ideas of the French far-right (including monarchism and Charles Maurras’ integralism) by a crisis government that was a client state, born out of the defeat of France against Nazi Germany. It included:

The conflation of legislative and executive powers: the Constitutional Acts drafted by Marshal Pétain on 11 July 1940 gave to him "more powers than to Louis XIV" (according to a quote by Pétain himself, brought by his civil head of staff, H. Du Moulin de Labarthète), including that of drafting a new Constitution.
Anti-parliamentarism and rejection of the multi-party system.
Personality cultism: Marshal Pétain's portrait was omnipresent, printed on money, stamps, walls or represented in sculptures. A song to his glory, Maréchal, nous voilà !, became the unofficial national anthem. Obedience to the leader and to the hierarchy was exalted.
Corporatism, with the establishment of a Labour Charter (suppression of trade-unions replaced by corporations organized by profession, suppression of the right to strike).
Stigmatization of those seen as responsible for the military defeat, expressed in particular during the Riom Trial (1942–43): the Third Republic, in particular the Popular Front (despite the fact that Léon Blum’s left-wing government prepared France for the war by launching a new military effort), Communists, Jews, etc. The defendants of the Riom Trial included Blum, Édouard Daladier, Paul Reynaud, Georges Mandel and Maurice Gamelin.
State-sponsored anti-Semitism. Jews, national or not, were excluded from the Nation, and prohibited from working in public services. The first law on the status of Jews was promulgated on 3 October 1940. Thousands of naturalized Jews were deprived of their citizenship, while all Jews were forced to wear a yellow badge. The next day, Pétain signed another edict, this one authorizing detainment of foreign Jews in France.  A numerus clausus drastically limited their presence at the University, among physicians, lawyers, filmmakers, bankers or small traders. Soon the list of off-limits works was greatly increased. In less than a year, more than half of the Jewish population in France was deprived of any means of subsistence. Foreign Jews first, then all Jews were at first detained in concentration camps in France, before being deported to Drancy internment camp where they were then sent to Nazi concentration camps.
“Organicism” and rejection of class conflict.
Promotion of traditional values. The Republican motto of “Liberté, Egalité, Fraternité” was replaced by the populist motto of “Labour, Family, Fatherland” (Travail, Famille, Patrie).
Rejection of cultural modernism and of intellectual and urban elites. Policy of “return to the earth”.

None of these changes were forced on France by Germany. The Vichy government instituted them voluntarily as part of the National Revolution, while Germany interfered little in internal French affairs for the first two years after the armistice as long as public order was maintained. It was suspicious of the aspects of the National Revolution that encouraged French patriotism, and banned Vichy veteran and youth groups from the Occupied Zone.

Support
The Révolution nationale particularly attracted three groups of persons. The Pétainistes gathered those who supported the personal figure of Marshal Pétain, considered at that time a war hero of the Battle of Verdun. The Collaborateurs include those who collaborated with Nazi Germany or advocated collaboration, but who are considered more moderate, or more opportunistic, than the Collaborationistes, advocates of a French fascism.

Supporters of collaboration were not necessarily supporters of the National Revolution, and vice versa. Pierre Laval was a collaborationist but was dubious about the National Revolution, while others like Maxime Weygand opposed collaboration but supported the National Revolution because they believed that reforming France would help it avenge its defeat.

Those who supported the ideology of the National Revolution rather than the person of Pétain himself could be divided, in general, into three groups: the counter-revolutionary reactionaries; the supporters of a French fascism; and the reformers who saw in the new regime in opportunity to modernize the state apparatus. The last current would include opportunists such as the journalist Jean Luchaire who saw in the new regime career opportunities.

The “Reactionaries”, in the strict sense of the word: all those who dreamt of a return to "before", either:
 before 1936 and the Popular Front
 before 1870 and the Third Republic or
 before 1789 and the French Revolution.

These were part of the counter-revolutionary branch of the French far right, the oldest one being composed of Legitimists, monarchist members of the Action française (AF), etc. But the Vichy regime also received support from large sectors of the liberal Orleanists, in particular from its mouthpiece, Le Temps newspaper.

The supporters of a “French fascism”, who attacked Vichy and Maurras for not seeking to bring Nazism to France. They opposed specific traditionalist aspects such as clericalism or "naive scouting", but still thought the Révolution nationale prepared for a "re-birth" of French society. These formed the most stringent Collaborationists (collaborationistes, distinct from collaborateurs who are seen as more moderate or more opportunist). Those included the supporters of Marcel Déat's Rassemblement national populaire (RNP), Jacques Doriot's Parti Populaire Français (PPF), Joseph Darnand's Service d'ordre légionnaire (SOL) militia, Marcel Bucard's Mouvement Franciste (originally funded by Benito Mussolini), members of the Cagoule terrorist group, funded by Eugène Schueller (the founder of L'Oréal cosmetic group), the writers Robert Brasillach, Louis-Ferdinand Céline or Pierre Drieu La Rochelle, Philippe Henriot at Radio Paris, etc.
The Reformers, who were looking for new political, social and economic policies, and formed an important group during the inter-war period. Those included the non-conformists of the 1930s, Christian-democrat personalists, neo-socialists, planistes, Young Turks of the Radical Socialist Party, technocrats (Groupe X-Crise), etc. All of these circles would also provide recruits to the Resistance. Most of them were not ideologically anti-democrats, but claimed to take advantage of the new conditions set by the Vichy regime—they also included plain opportunists willing to make a quick career. They presented various and contradictory solutions: communalism, cooperatives or corporations, "return to the earth", planned economy, technocracy rule, etc. Some examples include René Belin, Minister of Production and Labour, Lucien Romier, who also became Minister of Pétain, the civil servant Gérard Bardet, X-Crise member Pierre Pucheu, François Lehideux, Yves Bouthillier, Jacques Barnaud, or the École des cadres d'Uriage, which would form the basis after the war of the elite school École nationale d'administration (ENA).

The supporters were, however, in the minority. Although the Vichy government initially had substantial support from those who were glad that the war was over and expected that Britain would soon surrender, and Pétain remained personally popular during the war, by late autumn 1940 most French hoped for a British victory and opposed collaboration with Germany.

Evolution of the regime 
From July 1940 to 1942, the Révolution nationale was strongly promoted by the traditionalist and technocratic Vichy government. When in May 1942 Pierre Laval (a former socialist and republican) returned as the head of government, the Révolution nationale was no longer promoted but fell into oblivion and collaboration was emphasized.

Eugenics 
In 1941, Nobel Prize winner Alexis Carrel, who had been an early proponent of eugenics and euthanasia and was a member of Jacques Doriot's French Popular Party (PPF), went on to advocate for the creation of the French Foundation for the Study of Human Problems, using connections to the Pétain cabinet (specifically, French industrial physicians André Gros and Jacques Ménétrier). Charged with the "study, under all of its aspects, of measures aimed at safeguarding, improving and developing the French population in all of its activities," the Foundation was created by decree of the Vichy regime in 1941, and Carrel appointed as “regent”.

Sport policy 
Vichy's policy concerning sports found its origins in the conception of Georges Hébert (1875–1957), who denounced professional and spectacular competition, and like Pierre de Coubertin, founder of the Olympic Games was a supporter of amateurism. Vichy's sport policy followed the moral aim of "rebuilding the nation", was opposed to Léo Lagrange’s sport policy during the Popular Front, and was specifically opposed to professional sport imported from the United Kingdom. They also were used to engrain the youth in various associations and federations, as done by the Hitler Youth or Mussolini's Balilla.

On 7 August 1940, a Commissariat Général à l’Education Générale et Sportive (General Commissioner to General and Sport Education) was created. Three men in particular headed this policy:

Jean Ybarnegaray, president and founder of the French and International Federations of Basque pelota, deputy and member of François de la Rocque’s Parti Social Français (PSF). Ybarnegaray was first nominated State minister in May 1940, then State secretary from June to September 1940.
Jean Borotra, former international tennis player (member of “The Four Musketeers”) and also a PSF member, the first General Commissioner to Sports from August 1940 to April 1942.
Colonel Joseph Pascot, former rugby champion, director of sports under Borotra and then second General Commissioner to Sports from April 1942 to July 1944.

In October 1940, the two General Commissioners prohibited professionalism in two federations (tennis and wrestling), while permitting a three-year delay for four other federations (football, cycling, boxing and Basque pelota). They prohibited competitions for women in cycling or association football. Furthermore, they prohibited, or spoiled by seizing the assets of, at least four uni-sport federations (rugby league, table tennis, Jeu de paume and badminton) and one multi-sport federation (the FSGT). In April 1942, they additionally prohibited the activities of the UFOLEP and USEP multi-sport federations, also seizing their goods which were to be transferred to the “National Council of Sports”.

Quotes 
“Sport well directed is morality in action” (“Le sport bien dirigé, c’est de la morale en action”), Report of E. Loisel to Jean Borotra, 15 October 1940
“I pledge on my honour to practice sports with selflessness, discipline and loyalty to improve myself and serve better my fatherland” (Sportsman's pledge — « Je promets sur l’honneur de pratiquer le sport avec désintéressement, discipline et loyauté pour devenir meilleur et mieux servir ma patrie »)
“to be strong to serve better” (IO 1941)
“Our principle is to seize the individual everywhere. At primary school, we have him. Later on he tends to escape us. We strive to catch up with him at every turn. I have arranged for this discipline of EG (General Education) to be imposed on students (...) We allow for sanctions in case of desertion.” (« Notre principe est de saisir l’individu partout. Au primaire, nous le tenons. Plus haut il tend à s’échapper. Nous nous efforçons de le rattraper à tous les tournants. J’ai obtenu que cette discipline de l’EG soit imposée aux étudiants (…). Nous prévoyons des sanctions en cas de désertion »), Colonel Joseph Pascot, speech on 27 June 1942

See also 
Vichy France
Popular Front (France)
History of far right movements in France
History of France during the twentieth century
World War II and The Holocaust

References

External links 
 Loi et décret 1940-42
 Sports et Politique
 Politique  sportive du gouvernement de Vichy: discours  et réalité
 Sport et Français pendant l'occupation
 JP Azéma: Président commission "Politique du sport et éducation physique en France pendant l'occupation."
 Exemples: Badminton, Tennis de table, Jeu de paume Interdits
  Vichy et le football

Vichy France
Philippe Pétain
Far-right politics in France
Fascist movements
Reactionary